The boxing events of the 1963 Mediterranean Games were held in Naples, Italy.

Medalists

Medal table

References
1963 Mediterranean Games report at the International Committee of Mediterranean Games (CIJM) website
1963 Mediterranean Games boxing tournament at Amateur Boxing Results

Mediterranean Games
Sports at the 1963 Mediterranean Games
1963